Everlasting Chivalry is a 1980 Taiwanese film adapted from Gu Long's Chu Liuxiang novel series. The film was directed by Li Chao-yung and starred Meng Fei as the lead character.

Cast
Meng Fei as Chu Liuxiang
Doris Lung
Nancy Yen
Yun Zhong-yue
Suen Yuet
Chiang Ming
Lee Keung
Wong Bo-yuk
Chow Shui-fong
Li Jian-ping
Yang Kuei-mei
Su Chen-ping
Chan Leung-hap
Cheung Wai

External links

1980 films
Taiwanese action films
Wuxia films
Works based on Chu Liuxiang (novel series)
Films based on works by Gu Long
1980s Mandarin-language films